Lyudmyla Volodymyrivna Pavlenko (born 16 September 1981) is a Ukrainian Paralympic cross-country skier and biathlete, with cerebral palsy. She won a gold and bronze medal, at the 2014 Winter Paralympics.

She has a son, Mikhail, with her husband, Dmitri.

See also 
 Cross-country skiing at the 2014 Winter Paralympics – Women's 15 km Free
Biathlon at the 2014 Winter Paralympics – Women's 10 kilometres

References

1981 births
Living people
Ukrainian female cross-country skiers
Paralympic gold medalists for Ukraine
Sportspeople with cerebral palsy
Cerebral Palsy category Paralympic competitors
Cross-country skiers at the 2014 Winter Paralympics
Medalists at the 2014 Winter Paralympics
Medalists at the 2010 Winter Paralympics
Medalists at the 2006 Winter Paralympics
Cross-country skiers at the 2010 Winter Paralympics
Cross-country skiers at the 2006 Winter Paralympics
Biathletes at the 2010 Winter Paralympics
Ukrainian female biathletes
Paralympic medalists in cross-country skiing
Paralympic cross-country skiers of Ukraine